Årås is the administrative centre of Austrheim municipality in Vestland county, Norway.

References 

Villages in Vestland
Austrheim